Daniel Andrew "Dan" Norman (born September 29, 1964 in Toronto) is a Canadian slalom canoer who competed in the early-to-mid 1990s. He finished 30th in the C-1 event at the 1992 Summer Olympics in Barcelona. Daniel now teaches outdoor pursuits and mathematics at Brentwood College School in Mill Bay British Columbia Canada.

References
Sports-reference.com profile

1964 births
Canadian male canoeists
Canoeists at the 1992 Summer Olympics
Living people
Canoeists from Toronto
Olympic canoeists of Canada